The black cuckooshrike (Campephaga flava) is a species of bird in the cuckooshrike family Campephagidae. The species is closely related to Petit's cuckooshrike and the red-shouldered cuckooshrike, and forms a superspecies with them. It is also known as the African black cuckooshrike.

It is found in Angola, Botswana, Burundi, Democratic Republic of the Congo, Eswatini, Ethiopia, Kenya, Malawi, Mozambique, Namibia, Rwanda, Somalia, South Africa, South Sudan, Tanzania, Uganda, Zambia, and Zimbabwe.

Its natural habitats are subtropical or tropical moist lowland forests, dry savanna, and subtropical or tropical dry shrubland.

References

External links
 Black Cuckooshrike - Species text in The Atlas of Southern African Birds.

black cuckooshrike
Birds of Sub-Saharan Africa
black cuckooshrike
Taxa named by Louis Jean Pierre Vieillot
Taxonomy articles created by Polbot